Melinda Lou "Wendy" Thomas-Morse  (born September 14, 1961) is a daughter of American businessman Dave Thomas, the founder of the fast food brand Wendy's. Morse is the namesake and mascot of the brand. She uses the name Wendy Thomas in her role as a spokesperson for Wendy's.

Early life and education
Thomas was born in Columbus, Ohio, grew up in Upper Arlington, and is the fourth child of Dave and Lorraine Thomas.

As a child, Melinda was unable to pronounce her L's and R's, struggling with her own name Melinda, and so became known by her nickname Wendy (with the pen-pin merger). Then 8-year-old Melinda would eventually become the namesake of her father's restaurant Wendy's Old Fashioned Hamburgers, or just "Wendy's" for short. In addition to being the namesake, her likeness was used as the Wendy's logo in the form of a young freckle-faced girl in red braids. Morse graduated from the University of Florida in 1983 with a bachelor's degree in consumer behaviorism.

Career
Morse owned several Wendy's restaurants near Dallas, Texas until 1999.  After the death of her father Dave Thomas in 2002, Morse and her siblings bought restaurants in her native Columbus area. , Morse herself owned or co-owned more than 30 Wendy's stores. In November 2010, she began appearing in Wendy ads on camera for the first time. (Her voice was featured in a 1989 ad giving her father advice from off-camera.) The 2010 ads aired first in Las Vegas, Nevada; Mobile, Alabama; and Virginia Beach, Virginia; test markets before being rolled out nationally.

Since April 2012, she has starred in a series of ads for Wendy's called That Wendy's Way, reinforcing the quality values in ingredients, preparation and service her father established. She also appeared in the 'Dave's Hot 'N Juicy Cheeseburger' commercial produced by Publicis Groupe's Kaplan Thaler Group.

References

Further reading
 

Living people
1961 births
Businesspeople from Columbus, Ohio
University of Florida alumni
Wendy's International
Corporate mascots
Fast food advertising characters
Female characters in advertising